The 2005 NCAA Division I men's lacrosse tournament was the 35th annual Division I NCAA Men's Lacrosse Championship tournament. Sixteen NCAA Division I college men's lacrosse teams met after having played their way through a regular season, and for some, a conference tournament. The championship game was played at Lincoln Financial Field in Philadelphia, Pennsylvania in front of 44,920 fans, The Johns Hopkins Blue Jays won the championship title with a 9–8 win over Duke University. The Blue Jays, led by senior Kyle Harrison and sophomore goalie Jesse Schwartzman, won their eighth NCAA championship and  first national championship since 1987, while allowing just one goal the entire second half of the game. Schwartzman was named the tournament's outstanding player.

In an exciting national semi-final game, Hopkins won against Virginia in overtime on a goal by defensive short stick midfielder Benson Erwin. Virginia seemingly had the game locked up in regulation after scoring the go ahead goal with 12.9 seconds remaining. But Hopkins won the ensuing face off and raced down the field tying the game with 1.5 seconds to go, setting up Erwin's overtime heroics.

Tournament results 

 * = Overtime

References

External links
Erwin's OT Game-Winner Lifts Hopkins Past Virginia, 9-8
Blue Jays Knock off Duke, 9-8 for Program's Eighth NCAA Title

NCAA Division I Men's Lacrosse Championship
NCAA Division I Men's Lacrosse Championship
NCAA Division I Men's Lacrosse Championship
NCAA Division I Men's Lacrosse Championship